The following lists events that happened during 2016 in Ethiopia.

Incumbents
President: Mulatu Teshome
Prime Minister: Hailemariam Desalegn

Events

April
April 6 - Seasonal rains come early to the country, causing floods, leaving at least 28 people dead.
April 16 - Ethiopia claims that South Sudanese men killed at least 140 people across the border.

June
June 13 - Ethiopia and Eritrea argue over who caused a recent border clash between the two nations.

August
August 5 - Student protests erupt in Addis Ababa and quickly spread across the country.
August 8 - Over 50 protesters are killed by security forces over the past few days. Internet and journalist access is also restricted by the government.

September
September 5 - 23 prisoners are killed in a fire and stampede at the Kaliti Prison near the capital of Addis Ababa during an attempted prison break.

October
October 2 - Police allegedly attack Oromo protesters at a religious festival in Bishoftu, causing a stampede that killed 52 people.
October 5 - The railway line with Djibouti opens. However, an American women is killed during protests.
October 9 - A state of emergency is declared following months of protests against the government.
October 10 - Ethiopia blames Egypt and Eritrea for the recent unrest in the country.
October 20 - A government minister reveals that over 1600 people have been detained following the state of emergency.

November
November 24 - 20 aircraft pilots are detained in Ethiopia's Gambela region after "illegally" arriving from Sudan.

December
December 1 - After arriving back from a trip to Europe, Merera Gudina, an opposition leader, is detained for allegedly violating the state of emergency.

References

 
2010s in Ethiopia
Years of the 21st century in Ethiopia
Ethiopia
Ethiopia